The 2017–18 Colorado State Rams men's basketball team represented Colorado State University during the 2017–18 NCAA Division I men's basketball season. The team was coached by Larry Eustachy in his sixth season. The Rams played their home games at Moby Arena on CSU's main campus in Fort Collins, Colorado as members of the Mountain West Conference.

On February 3, 2018, prior to their game against Nevada, Eustachy was placed on administrative leave amid an internal investigation by Colorado State of Eustachy's conduct with players and other staff members. Eustachy had previously been reprimanded by the university in 2017 for the same type of behavior from a 2014 university led investigation. On February 8, players boycotted practice because of the lack of communication from the athletic department as to the situation. On the same day, it was reported that Eustachy would be fired by the school.

The Rams were initially led by assistant coach Steve Barnes for the first 2 games of Eustachy's absence. However, prior to the team's home game against San Jose State on February 10, he was also placed on administrative leave. Assistant coach Jase Herl took over as interim head coach for the rest of the season.

On February 26, Eustachy officially resigned from Colorado State.

The Rams finished the season 11–21, 4–14 in Mountain West play to finish in tenth place. They lost in the first round of the Mountain West tournament to Utah State.

On March 22, Drake head coach and former CSU assistant coach Niko Medved was hired as the new head coach of the Rams.

Previous season
The Rams finished the 2016–17 season 24–12, 13–5 in Mountain West play to finish in second place. They defeated Air Force and San Diego State to advance to the championship game of the Mountain West tournament where they lost to Nevada. They were invited to the 2017 National Invitation Tournament where they defeated the College of Charleston in the first round before losing in the second round to Cal State Bakersfield.

Offseason

Departures

Incoming transfers

2017 recruiting class

Preseason 
In a vote by conference media at the Mountain West media day, the Rams were picked to finish in fifth place in the Mountain West.

Roster

Schedule and results

|-
!colspan=9 style=| Exhibition

|-
!colspan=9 style=| Non-conference regular season

|-
!colspan=9 style=| Mountain West regular season

|-
!colspan=9 style=| Mountain West tournament 

Source

References 

Colorado State Rams men's basketball seasons
Colorado State
Colorado State Rams
Colorado State Rams